Tribes of the City is a shoegaze, dreampop band from Riga, Latvia. The band was formed in 2003 and  has recorded four full-length albums. They have gained a nationwide success and were nominated for MTV Europe Music Awards 2007 as the best Baltic act. The band received an Austra's Award for their 2019 record Rust and Gold named Best Album of 2019 in Latvia.

History 
Their first album Running to the Sun was released on Melo Records in 2004 under the name The Movies. The band changed their name to Tribes of the City in 2005.

Band's second album For the Sleepy People was produced by Greg Haver, who is known for his work with such bands as Manic Street Preachers, Super Furry Animals and Catatonia.

In 2009 the band teamed up with Gatis Zakis and produced their third record, this time a double Recipe of the Golden Dream.

In 2019, a decade after the previous album, Tribes of the City independently released Rust and Gold on vinyl and major streaming platforms. It was produced by Adam Cooper of Alison's Halo at Jetpack Studios (Chicago, IL) and mastered by Brian Wenckebach at Electric Blue Studios (Blooklyn, NY).

Their album Rust and Gold has been nominated for IMPALA's European Independent Album of the Year Award (2019).

Discography

Albums

Radio singles

References

External links 
Tribes of the City on Bandcamp
Tribes of the City on Myspace
Tribes of the City on Facebook

Latvian post-rock groups